The British Yearbook of International Law is an annual peer reviewed academic journal of law. It is published by Oxford University Press.

The editors are professor Eyal Benvenisti and professor Catherine Redgwell.

References 

Oxford University Press academic journals
Law journals